Rip It Up is the eleventh studio album by hard rock band Thunder and the follow-up to their 2015 album Wonder Days. The album was released in the UK on 10 February 2017 and entered the UK album chart at number three, giving the band their highest placing since their 1992 album Laughing on Judgement Day.

Track listing 
All songs written by Luke Morley.

"No One Gets Out Alive" – 4:21
"Rip It Up – 4:43
"She Likes the Cocaine" – 4:34
"Right from the Start" – 5:23
"Shakedown" – 4:08
"Heartbreak Hurricane" – 4:46
"In Another Life" – 4:57
"The Chosen One" – 5:09
"The Enemy Inside" – 3:10
"Tumbling Down" – 5:25
"There's Always a Loser" – 4:38

Personnel 
Danny Bowes – lead and backing vocals
Luke Morley – guitars, keyboards and backing vocals
Gary James – drums and percussion
Ben Matthews – guitars and keyboard
Chris Childs – bass guitar
Lynne Jackaman – backing vocals, tambourine and featured vocals on "She Likes the Cocaine"
Heather Findlay – backing vocals
Susie Webb – backing vocals

Production
Josh Tyrell – studio assistance
Jon Constantine – studio assistance
Joe Coghlan-Allen – studio assistance

Charts

References 

2017 albums
Thunder (band) albums
Albums recorded at Rockfield Studios